Bloomfield is a town within Richland Township and the county seat of Greene County, Indiana, United States. The population was 2,405 at the 2010 census.

Bloomfield is part of the Bloomington, Indiana Metropolitan Statistical Area.

History 
The area where Bloomfield is located has been inhabited by Native Americans since prehistory.  Tribes that have lived in the area include the Miami tribe, Kickapoo, Piankeshaw and Wea. A settlement of Woodland period people has been excavated by Indiana Ball State Universities research teams near the confluence of Richland Creek and the White River south of Bloomfield.

The town of Bloomfield was laid out in 1824 when Greene County needed a new county seat due to the lack of a reliable water source for the town of Burlington.  Burlington was located west of Bloomfield near the west fork of the White River.

The Greene County Courthouse, a log building in the town's center, was the town's first building. The current Greene County Courthouse, a brick structure built in the late 19th century, stands at the same location.  An expansion and renovation project was completed in 2008.  It was listed on the National Register of Historic Places in 2008.

In 1824, Peter Cornelius Van Slyke donated land to Greene County for the purpose of establishing a new county seat.
  
Van Slyke was born on the Mohawk River in Schenectady County, New York, on April 5, 1766.   He migrated to southern Indiana in 1816.   Van Slyke was a veteran of the War of 1812 and died on September 25, 1834.

Bloomfield Jr./Sr. High School has also been home to Indiana Basketball Hall of Fame coaches Guy Glover (1954-1977) and Steve Brett (1978-1993).

Geography

Demographics

2010 census
As of the 2010 census, there were 2,405 people, 1,109 households, and 628 families living in the town. The racial makeup of the town was 98.0% White, 0.5% African American, 0.6% Asian, 0.1% from other races, and 0.7% from two or more races. Hispanic or Latino of any race were 1.3% of the population.

There were 1,109 households, of which 29.7% had children under the age of 18 living with them, 40.3% were married couples living together, 12.9% had a female householder with no husband present, 3.4% had a male householder with no wife present, and 43.4% were non-families. 40.2% of all households were made up of individuals, and 18.7% had someone living alone who was 65 years of age or older. The average household size was 2.16 and the average family size was 2.89.

The median age in the town was 39.7 years. 24.5% of residents were under the age of 18; 8.3% were between the ages of 18 and 24; 24.3% were from 25 to 44; 24.5% were from 45 to 64; and 18.5% were 65 years of age or older. The gender makeup of the town was 46.9% male and 53.1% female.

2000 census
As of the 2000 census, there were 2,542 people, 1,180 households, and 665 families living in the town. The racial makeup of the town was 98.31% White, 0.20% African American, 0.08% Native American, 0.43% Asian, 0.31% from other races, and 0.67% from two or more races. Hispanic or Latino of any race were 1.10% of the population.

There were 1,180 households, out of which 23.6% had children under the age of 18 living with them, 43.6% were married couples living together, 10.3% had a female householder with no husband present, and 43.6% were non-families. 40.5% of all households were made up of individuals, and 18.9% had someone living alone who was 65 years of age or older. The average household size was 2.06 and the average family size was 2.76.

In the town, the population was spread out, with 20.8% under the age of 18, 8.5% from 18 to 24, 26.2% from 25 to 44, 22.7% from 45 to 64, and 21.7% who were 65 years of age or older. The median age was 41 years. For every 100 females, there were 91.0 males. For every 100 females age 18 and over, there were 87.2 males.

The median income for a household in the town was $30,224, and the median income for a family was $42,656. Males had a median income of $31,864 versus $23,879 for females. The per capita income for the town was $18,045. About 12.0% of families and 16.6% of the population were below the poverty line, including 21.2% of those under age 18 and 11.8% of those age 65 or over.

Education
 Bloomfield has a public library, a branch of the Bloomfield-Eastern Greene County Bloomfield Public Library.

 The Bloomfield Public Library Annex is located on the corner of Spring Street and Washington Street. 

 Bloomfield School District consists of grades K-12. All grades are contained in the same location/building.

Arts and culture

 The Bloomfield Town Park is located at 61 West Main Street adjacent to the Bloomfield School. Located in the park is a Turn-of-the-Century Bandstand, 2 enclosed shelter houses, 2 open shelter houses, an array of play ground equipment, two basketball open basketball courts and one enclosed basketball courts. 
 One of the best preserved covered bridges in the state is Bloomfield's Richland-Plummer Creek Covered Bridge, built by A.M. Kennedy and Sons in 1883. It is located approximately 1 miles south of town. It was listed on the National Register of Historic Places in 1993.
 The World's Largest Hi-Lift Jack is located in front of the Hi-Lift Jack Company/Bloomfield Manufacturing Company on Spring Street in Bloomfield. The replica jack, produced to commemorate the company's 100th anniversary, is made of cast iron, stands 20 feet tall, and weights 2,980 pounds.
 Near Bloomfield is the Tulip Viaduct.
 Bloomfield is the home of the Shawnee Summer Theatre Indiana's oldest continuously running professional summer theater.  Shawnee has operated, uninterrupted, since 1960.
 The man who owned the land where Bloomfield was built (Peter Cornelius Van Slyke) is buried in Bloomfield in the Van Slyke cemetery on the west end of town (behind the old woolen mill).
 Shawnee Field is approximately 5 miles west of town.
 Just east of Bloomfield is the source for Walnut Grove premium Spring Water.

Festivals
 Annual Bloomfield Apple Festival and Parade held typically on the first full weekend of October in the Bloomfield Town Park. 
 Fireworks held on the 4th of July. 
 Annual Christmas on the Square, Lighted Christmas Parade and Lighting of the Park is held in December. 
 Annual Easter Egg Hunt, Saturday before Easter.

References

External links

 Bloomfield School District
 Bloomfield Volunteer Fire Department

Towns in Greene County, Indiana
Towns in Indiana
County seats in Indiana
Bloomington metropolitan area, Indiana